Matti Manushulu is a 1990 Indian Telugu-language drama film written and directed by B. Narsing Rao starring Archana. The film won the Best Feature Film in Telugu at the 38th National Film Awards, "For portraying the stark reality of pain which has been underlined with the warm hues of life" as cited by the Jury.

Plot 
The film explores the lives of laborers and construction workers of Urban India.

International honors 
The film won Diploma of Merit award at the 17th Moscow International Film Festival in 1991. The film was subsequently screened at the 1990 International Film Festival of India.

References 

1990 films
1990s Telugu-language films
Best Telugu Feature Film National Film Award winners
Films about labour
Films about poverty in India
Films about social issues in India
Indian avant-garde and experimental films
Indian drama films
Indian nonlinear narrative films
Social realism in film
Films scored by Ilaiyaraaja
Films directed by B. Narsing Rao